Abdulraheem Salim (born 1955) is an Emirati painter and sculptor born in Dubai and lives in Sharjah, United Arab Emirates. He is one of the first contributors to the fine art movements in the UAE alongside Hassan Sharif, Abdul Qader Al Raes and others. Salim completed his Bachelor of Fine arts and sculpture at the University of Cairo in 1981.

Awards 
 1992 The Jury’s Award at Cairo Biennial
 1993  Sharjah biennial 1st prize 
 1993 The silver award at the 6th Bangladesh Biennial
 2008 State Honor Award for Fine Arts, UAE

Exhibitions 
 (1981-2001) The annual exhibitions of the Emirates Fine Arts Society
 (1983- 1984) First and Second GCC Art Exhibitions, Doha, Qatar 
 1983 Negative and Positive Exhibition 
 1988-1992-1995 Cairo Biennial 
 1995 Bangladesh Biennial 
 1990 The first exhibition of the Emirates Fine Arts Society in India.
 1996 Arabian Colors Exhibition, Sharjah Art Museum, UAE
 1998 the UAE in the Eyes of its Artists, Cultural foundation, Abu Dhabi 
 2000 The UAE Expo Hanover, Germany.
 2001 Sharjah Biennial, UAE
 2015 UAE Pavilion, Venice Biennial, Italy

See also 

List of Emirati artists

References 

Emirati painters
Emirati contemporary artists
Emirati sculptors
Living people
1955 births
People from Dubai